Glapwell is a civil parish in the Bolsover District of Derbyshire, England.  The parish contains three listed buildings that are recorded in the National Heritage List for England.  All the listed buildings are designated at Grade II, the lowest of the three grades, which is applied to "buildings of national importance and special interest".  The parish contains the village of Glapwell and the surrounding area, and the listed buildings consist of a farmhouse, and two structures associated with the demolished Glapwell Hall.


Buildings

References

Citations

Sources

 

Lists of listed buildings in Derbyshire